Tiziana is an Italian feminine given name. The masculine form is Tiziano. Notable people with the name include:
Flavia Titiana, Roman empress who ruled in 193 AD
Tiziana Alagia (born 1973), Italian long-distance runner 
Tiziana Cantone, an Italian victim of cyberbullying
Paola Tiziana Cruciani (born 1958), Italian actress, comedian and playwright 
Tiziana Domínguez (born 1985), Spanish fashion designer and artist 
Tiziana Lauri (born 1959), Italian ballerina 
Tiziana Lodato (born 1976), Italian film, stage and television actress 
Tiziana Nisini (born 1975), Italian politician 
Tiziana D'Orio (born 1964), Italian football midfielder 
Tiziana Pini (born 1958), Italian actress and television personality 
Tiziana Realini (born 1984), Swiss Olympic equestrian
Tiziana Rivale (born 1960), Italian singer 
Tiziana Scandaletti, Italian soprano
Tiziana Terranova, Italian theorist and activist in information technology 
Tiziana Vonlanthen (born 1991), Swiss rhythmic gymnast 

Italian feminine given names